Sergei Uasyl-ipa Bagapsh (4 March 1949 – 29 May 2011) was an Abkhaz politician who served as the second President of Abkhazia from 12 February 2005 until his death on 29 May 2011. He previously served as Prime Minister of Abkhazia from 1997 to 1999. He was re-elected in the 2009 presidential election. Bagapsh's term as Prime Minister included the 1998 war with Georgia, while he oversaw both the recognition of Abkhazia by Russia and the Russo-Georgian War during his presidency.

Born in 1949 in Sukhumi, Bagapsh became a businessman following the dissolution of the Soviet Union, as well as a representative of Abkhazian interests in Russia. Bagapsh became Prime Minister of Abkhazia in 1997, overseeing a brief, but successful, war with Georgia during a high point of tensions and the displacement of 30,000 Georgian civilians. In 2004, Bagapsh founded the United Abkhazia party in opposition to then-President Vladislav Ardzinba.

The same year, Bagapsh ran for President against Raul Khajimba, Ardzinba's choice, and originally was forecast as losing to Khajimba. A political crisis followed, with the Supreme Court of Abkhazia declaring Bagapsh the winner and protests against the election both by supporters of Bagapsh and Khajimba. The two eventually ran on a national unity ticket, with Bagapsh becoming President and Khajimba becoming Vice President in 2005.

As President, Bagapsh lobbied for the international recognition of Abkhazia, eventually receiving receiving recognition from Russia in 2008 following the successful capture of the Kodori Valley in the Russo-Georgian War by Russian and Abkhazian forces. Following the country's recognition by Russia, widespread investment by Russian businesses and pressure to privatise assets drew both support and criticism. Bagapsh successfully won a second term against Khajimba before dying of heart failure on 29 May 2011, due to complications from a surgery to remove cancerous growths on his lung.

Early life and career
Sergei Bagapsh was born on 4 March 1949 at Sukhumi in the Georgian SSR. Throughout most of his life, he had lived in Abkhazia. In his youth, Bagapsh was a member of the Georgian basketball team. Bagapsh graduated from the Georgian State University of Subtropical Agriculture in Sukhumi. During his studies he worked first, in a wine cooperative and later as a security guard for the state bank. In 1972, he fulfilled his military service, worked as the head of a sovkhoz following which he became instructor with the Abkhazian regional committee of the Komsomol.

In 1978, Bagapsh became responsible for information in the central committee of the Komsomol's Georgian branch and in 1980, first secretary of the Abkhazian Regional Committee. In 1982, Sergei Bagapsh became secretary general of the Communist Party in the Ochamchira District. After the fall of communism, Bagapsh became a businessman and the representative of the Abkhazian government in Moscow. From 1995 until 1997, Bagapsh was First Deputy Prime MInister of Abkhazia. On 9 November 1995, Bagapsh was seriously wounded in an attack.

Prime Minister
Sergei Bagapsh was appointed to the office of Prime Minister of Abkhazia on 29 April 1997.

Georgian-Abkhazian tensions during Bagapsh's term in office reached a height in May 1998, following attacks by Georgian insurgents on peacekeeping forces from the Commonwealth of Independent States. Subsequently, a military conflict erupted between CIS and Georgian insurgent forces. In the subsequent war, sometimes referred to as the "Six-Day War", Abkhazian forces eliminated the insurgents, and 30,000 Georgian civilians fled Abkhazia.

2004 presidential election

From 2000 until 2004, Sergei Bagapsh was the managing director of the Abkhazian state-owned power company Chernomorenergo. During the same period, he began to emerge as a likely opposition candidate in the lead-up to the 2004 presidential election. In early 2004, he became one of three leaders of the newly founded opposition party, United Abkhazia. On 20 July 2004, United Abkhazia joined forces with Amtsakhara, another important opposition party, and the two named him as their joint candidate for the coming October presidential elections, beating out other hopefuls, such as former foreign minister Sergey Shamba.

In the elections, Bagapsh and his main opponent, Raul Khajimba, disputed the results. The Abkhaz Electoral Commission originally declared Khajimba to be the winner, with Bagapsh a distant second, but the Supreme Court later found that Bagapsh had actually won with 50.3% of the vote. The court then reversed its decision when Khajimba's supporters stormed the court building. At one point, Bagapsh and his supporters threatened to hold their own inauguration on 6 December 2004. However, in early December, Bagapsh and Khajimba reached an agreement to run together on a national unity ticket. New elections were held on 12 January 2005, with this ticket easily winning. Under the agreement, Bagapsh ran for president and Khajimba ran for vice-president.

Following Bagapsh's election, Russia placed an imports ban on Abkhazia, leading to several tangerines destined for Russian markets rotting at the border. The presidential election and subsequent political crisis was termed by some, including the BBC, as the "Tangerine Revolution", both as a reference to the Rose Revolution in Georgia the year prior and Abkhazia's tangerines.

Recognition of Abkhazia by Russia 
In August 2008, the Russo-Georgian War began following the 2008 Russo-Georgian diplomatic crisis. Following the war, Abkhazia gained control over the Kodori Valley, as well as recognition by Russia, Venezuela, and Nicaragua. Following Russia's recognition of Abkhaz independence, Russian businesses began to invest extensively within the country, particularly in real estate, infrastructure, and energy. Pressure began mounting on Bagapsh from Russian sources to hasten economic privatisation in preparation for the 2014 Winter Olympics, while Abkhazian political opponents accused him of selling off Abkhazian assets.

2009 Presidential election

Bagapsh first addressed the matter of his candidacy in the 12 December 2009 presidential election when, during a press conference in Moscow on 18 April 2009, he announced that he would probably make use of his constitutional right to run for a second term. Bagapsh was nominated on 27 October by United Abkhazia, with Prime Minister Alexander Ankvab of Aitaira as his vice presidential candidate. On 18 November, Bagapsh received the additional support of the Communist Party of Abkhazia.

Death

In May 2011, cancerous growths were discovered on Bagapsh's lung. On 21 May, Bagapsh underwent surgery in a Moscow clinic. Though the growths were successfully removed, Bagapsh died on 29 May due to heart failure that resulted from what was described as "complications" from the surgery. After the surgery, doctors discovered he had cancer. Alexander Ankvab took over as acting president with an election scheduled to be held on 26 August.

Reactions
Abkhaz parliament speaker Nugzar Ashuba told Russian state television that, although the death was completely unexpected, the situation remains calm.

Russian President Dmitry Medvedev offered his condolences saying: "Bagapsh was a loyal supporter of friendship and alliance with Russia, and he tirelessly worked to deepen close bilateral ties between our countries."

Legacy

A state commission was installed to perpetuate the memory of Sergei Bagapsh. On 26 January 2012, the City Council of Sukhumi unanimously accepted a proposal by Mayor Alias Labakhua to rename the Square of the Constitution of the USSR after Bagapsh.

See also
Bagapsh Government

Notes

References

External links

President of the Republic of Abkhazia. Official site

|-

1949 births
2011 deaths
Communist Party of the Soviet Union members
People from Sukhumi
People of the Russo-Georgian War
Presidents of Abkhazia
Prime Ministers of Abkhazia
Recipients of the Order of Friendship (South Ossetia)
United Abkhazia politicians
1st convocation of the People's Assembly of Abkhazia
First Vice Premiers of Abkhazia
Candidates in the 2004 Abkhazian presidential election
Candidates in the 2005 Abkhazian presidential election
Candidates in the 2009 Abkhazian presidential election
Deaths from surgical complications